Clyde Herbert "Tony" DeFate (February 22, 1895 – September 3, 1963) was an American professional baseball player who played one season in Major League Baseball as an infielder for two teams. In , he played for the St. Louis Cardinals of the National League and appeared in 14 games, and later for the Detroit Tigers of the American League and appeared in three games.  In his 17-game major league career, he collected two hits in 16 at bats for a .125 batting average. As a fielder, playing both as a third baseman and second baseman, he had six assists while not committing an error. In addition to his major league career, he played a total of 15 seasons in minor league baseball for various organizations at differing levels. Defate died at the age of 68 in New Orleans, Louisiana, and is interred at Lafayette Memorial Park in Lafayette, Louisiana.

References

External links

1895 births
1963 deaths
Major League Baseball infielders
Baseball players from Kansas City, Missouri
St. Louis Cardinals players
Detroit Tigers players
Topeka Savages players
St. Paul Saints (AA) players
Omaha Rourkes players
Sioux City Indians players
Columbus Senators players
Sioux City Packers players
St. Joseph Saints players
Minneapolis Millers (baseball) players
Omaha Buffaloes players
Wichita Falls Spudders players
Chattanooga Lookouts players
Columbus Foxes players
New Orleans Pelicans (baseball) players
Waterloo Hawks (baseball) players
Pueblo Steelworkers players
Pine Bluff Judges players
Augusta Wolves players
El Dorado Lions players